The men's 500 metres at the 2007 Asian Winter Games was held on January 30, 2007 at Wuhuan Gymnasium, China.

Schedule
All times are China Standard Time (UTC+08:00)

Results
Legend
DNS — Did not start
DSQ — Disqualified

Heats

Heat 1

Heat 2

Heat 3

Heat 4

Heat 5

Quarterfinals

Heat 1

Heat 2

Heat 3

Heat 4

Semifinals

Heat 1

Heat 2

Finals

Final B

Final A

References

Heats
Quarterfinals
Semifinals
Finals

External links
Official website

Men 0500